FISA may refer to:

 Foreign Intelligence Surveillance Act, a statute in the United States
 Foreign Intelligence Surveillance Act of 1978 Amendments Act of 2008 to the act
 Fédération Internationale des Sociétés Aérophilatéliques or International Federation of Aerophilatelic Societies
 Fédération Internationale des Sociétés d'Aviron or the International Federation of Rowing Associations, the governing body for international rowing
 Fédération Internationale du Sport Automobile, historically a subsidiary body of the FIA
 Federation of Irish Scout Associations, a member of the World Organisation of the Scout Movement
 Fighting Internet and Wireless Spam Act (Bill C-28), Canadian anti-spam legislation
 Fibras Industriales S.A., a fishing net, rope, twine, float and pp bag manufacturer in Lima, Peru
 Federation of Indian Student Associations in Australia, an umbrella body of Indian Students Associations in Australia